Wataugans may refer to:

The Wataugans, the former name of the play Liberty! The Saga of Sycamore Shoals
Watauga Association, a government in the 1770s
People living along the Watauga River
Residents of Watauga County, North Carolina